Vaz or Waz in Iran may refer to:
 Vaz-e Olya
 Vaz-e Sofla
 Vaz-e Tangeh